Ilya Andreyevich Mikheyev (born 10 October 1994) is a Russian professional ice hockey right winger for the Vancouver Canucks of the National Hockey League (NHL).

Playing career
Mikheyev started his career in the school of Avangard Omsk. In 2012 he started playing in the youth team Omskie Yastreby in the MHL. In 2013 he won the Kharlamov Cup with his team. In the 2013–14 season he started playing for Yermak Angarsk, the farm team of Avangard in the VHL. in the next seasons he also played for Sokol Krasnoyarsk and Saryarka Karagandy, that time farm teams of Avangard, in the VHL. In the 2015–16 season he started playing for Avangard in the Kontinental Hockey League. He established quickly in the team. The 2017–18 season he finished as the top scorer of Avangard with 38 points.

In 62 games during the 2018–19 season, Mikheyev recorded 23 goals and 22 assists for 45 points to again finish as the club's top point scorer. In the post-season he helped Avangard reach the Gagarin Cup finals recording 11 points in 13 games.

On 6 May 2019, Mikheyev signed a one-year, entry-level contract with the Toronto Maple Leafs of the National Hockey League (NHL). On 2 October 2019, during the Maple Leafs' home opener, Mikheyev scored his first NHL goal and added an assist in a 5–3 victory over the Ottawa Senators. After his debut, he made a passing comment about how he loved soup, which eventually led to a partnership with the Campbell Soup Company. In an away game against the New Jersey Devils on 27 December, Devils forward Jesper Bratt fell, causing his skate blade to cut Mikheyev's wrist. Mikheyev suffered a laceration on his wrist and was removed from the game. He immediately underwent surgery at University Hospital in Newark to repair an artery and tendons in his wrist. Leafs general manager Kyle Dubas and assistant athletic trainer Jon Geller cleared their schedules so Mikheyev would have familiar people around in the three days between his surgery and flying back to Toronto. Mikheyev did not return for the remainder of the regular season, which was cut short due to the COVID-19 pandemic, but was able to return for the playoffs. He went pointless in 5 games as the Leafs fell to the Columbus Blue Jackets in the first round. In the following playoffs against the Montreal Canadiens he was again held scoreless, increasing his total to 12 playoff games without a single point.

On 20 October 2020, Mikheyev signed a 2-year, $3.29 million contract with the Maple Leafs, avoiding his salary arbitration hearing which had been set for the following day. It was also reported that Mikheyev willingly reduced his salary after a request from Leafs general manager Dubas, in order to ensure the team would remain under the salary cap.

On 13 July 2022, Mikheyev having left the Maple Leafs as a free agent was signed to a four-year, $19 million contract with the Vancouver Canucks.

International play
In 2017, Mikheyev played for Team Russia at the 2017 Deutschland Cup. He was later added to make his full international debut for Russia at the 2018 World Championships in Denmark.

Career statistics

Regular season and playoffs

International

References

External links
 

1994 births
Living people
Avangard Omsk players
Expatriate ice hockey players in Canada
Omskie Yastreby players
Sportspeople from Omsk
Russian expatriate sportspeople in Canada
Russian ice hockey forwards
Saryarka Karagandy players
Sokol Krasnoyarsk players
Toronto Maple Leafs players
Undrafted National Hockey League players
Vancouver Canucks players
Yermak Angarsk players